Thirty Thousand Feet Over China is the second studio album by English post-punk/new wave band The Passions, released 18 September 1981 by Polydor Records. It reached No. 92 in the UK Albums Chart. It contains the group's hit single "I'm in Love with a German Film Star".

Track listing

2008 Cherry Red CD bonus tracks:

Personnel
The Passions
Barbara Gogan – vocals, guitar; piano on "Small Stones"
Clive Timperley – guitar, vocals; piano on "Someone Special"
David Agar – bass, vocals; guitar on "Small Stones", additional percussion on "Skin Deep"
Richard Williams – percussion
Technical
Martin Moss, Pete Buhlmann – engineer
Jeff Veitch – cover photography

References

External links
 

1981 albums
Albums produced by Nigel Gray
Polydor Records albums
The Passions (British band) albums